Kaushalendra Singh (born 1 July 1974) is an Indian politician and former mayor of Varanasi. Singh is a member of the Bharatiya Janata Party and was elected to office in 2006 and served till 2012.

Early life
Singh was born in Mirzapur district in 1976. He completed his secondary education at Central Hindu Boys School and then attended the Faculty of Commerce at the Banaras Hindu University, being awarded a master's degree in commerce.

Political career
Singh is a member of the Bharatiya Janata Party and was elected mayor of Varanasi in 2006 and remained in office till 2012.

References

Bharatiya Janata Party politicians from Uttar Pradesh
1974 births
Living people
Uttar Pradesh MLAs 2017–2022
Politicians from Varanasi
Mayors of Varanasi